Mesochelifer is a genus of pseudoscorpions belonging to the family Cheliferidae.

The species of this genus are found in Northern Europe.

Species:
 Mesochelifer fradei Vachon, 1940 
 Mesochelifer insignis Callaini, 1986

References

Cheliferidae
Pseudoscorpion genera